Placochelyidae is an extinct family of placodonts belonging to the superfamily Cyamodontoidea.

Genus
Glyphoderma
Placochelys
Psephosauriscus
Psephochelys
Psephoderma

References

Placodonts
Prehistoric reptile families
Triassic sauropterygians
Middle Triassic first appearances
Late Triassic first appearances